The Uganda International is an international badminton tournament held in Uganda organised by Uganda Badminton Association. In 2008, this tournament have been sanctioned by Badminton World Federation as International Series rated event with total prize money US$5000. For the badminton players, this tournament become a landmark for Uganda, because they can improved their point in world ranking and also in certain years, the points will be the Olympic Games qualification.

Previous winners

Performances by nation

References

External links
Uganda Badminton Association (UBA)

Badminton tournaments
Sports competitions in Uganda
Badminton tournaments in Uganda